Bryony Pitman (born 13 March 1997) is a British archer competing in women's recurve events. She won the gold medal in the women's recurve team event at the 2019 European Games held in Minsk, Belarus. Earlier in 2019, she won the bronze medal in the women's team recurve event at the World Archery Championships held in 's-Hertogenbosch, Netherlands.

In 2014, she competed in the girls' individual and mixed team events at the Summer Youth Olympics held in Nanjing, China. In the individual event, she finished in 14th place in the ranking rounds. She advanced to the elimination rounds where she was eliminated in her first match by Regina Romero of Guatemala.

In 2021, she represented Great Britain at the 2020 Summer Olympics in Tokyo, Japan. She competed in the women's individual and women's team events. She also competed at the 2021 World Archery Championships held in Yankton, United States. She competed in the women's recurve, women's team recurve and recurve mixed team events.

She won the silver medal in the women's recurve event at the 2022 World Games held in Birmingham, Alabama, United States.

References

External links 
 

Living people
1997 births
Sportspeople from Brighton
British female archers
Archers at the 2014 Summer Youth Olympics
World Archery Championships medalists
Archers at the 2019 European Games
European Games gold medalists for Great Britain
European Games medalists in archery
Olympic archers of Great Britain
Archers at the 2020 Summer Olympics
Competitors at the 2022 World Games
World Games silver medalists
World Games medalists in archery
20th-century British women
21st-century British women